"You Know That I Love You" is a song by Latin rock group Santana. It was released as a single in 1979 from their album Marathon.

The song scratched the Top 40 on the Billboard Hot 100, peaking at #35.

Chart performance

References

1979 songs
Columbia Records singles
Santana (band) songs
Songs written by Carlos Santana